Parc (meaning Park in English) is the name of an ancient mansion found near the village of Croesor in the community of Llanfrothen near Penrhyndeudraeth, in Gwynedd, Wales. The former mansion has been in ruins since the end of the 17th century when the resident Anwyl Family moved to Llugwy. Thomas Nicholas described the site in his Annals and Antiquities of the Counties and County Families of Wales [see box].

The novelist, poet, and playwright Richard A.W. Hughes rented a cottage here from close friends Clough and Amabel Williams-Ellis during the summers from 1934 until the Second World War, eventually taking in six evacuee children and telling stories with them that are collected in Don't Blame Me! (1940).

Parc is a Grade II* listed building and its gardens are designated Grade II on the Cadw/ICOMOS Register of Parks and Gardens of Special Historic Interest in Wales.

References

Buildings and structures in Gwynedd
Registered historic parks and gardens in Gwynedd
Grade II* listed buildings in Gwynedd
History of Wales